Shivani Singh Tharu is a Nepalese former talk show host, model, and playwright. She has written a novel named Kathmanduma Ek Din, which is a political thriller. She also came out in support of the #metoo movement.

References

Nepalese television presenters
21st-century Nepalese writers
Living people
Year of birth missing (living people)